Clifford Frank Last OBE (13 December 1918 – 20 October 1991) was an English sculptor, the son of Nella Last, author of a World War II diary on which the TV film Housewife, 49 was based.

Early life 
Clifford Last was the younger son of Nella and William Last, shopfitter in Barrow-in-Furness, England. He had an older brother, Arthur. After war service in which he lost his closest companion and was injured himself, he trained in art and emigrated to Australia in 1947, becoming a noted sculptor. Some of his works are displayed in the National Gallery of Australia and the Ballarat Fine Art Gallery in the State of Victoria

Centre Five group 
Last was a foundation member of Centre Five, a group formed in 1960 to promote contemporary abstract sculpture in Australia. The group, originally called Centre Four, was founded in 1953 by Hungarian-born Julius Kane, featuring Last, Norma Redpath and German-born Inge King. Centre Five was a splinter group of the Victorian Sculptors' Society comprising members Clifford Last, Inge King, Vincas Jomantas, Teisutis Zikaras, Julius Kane and Lenton Parr. They shared common characteristics in their style and felt that exhibiting together would be to their advantage. Their aim was to foster the understanding of modern sculpture among Australian architects and the public.

The project was problematic in that they had resigned from the Victorian Sculptors' Society and in effect set themselves up as competition. The result was a severe split in the very small sculpture world of the time, the repercussions of which are still felt today. Due to the nature of the split, the Society – formed to promote the work of members – missed out on official consideration. Last later was a member of the Commonwealth Art Advisory Board.

Work 

Materials with which Last worked included bronze, slate, wood and aluminium. Using wood as his favoured medium, Last furthered his studies at the Royal Melbourne Institute of Technology. After he spent fourteen months back in England in 1950–1951, Last's work took on a more geometrical form. He explored the use of shapes that he believed demonstrated the emotions existing in family groups and then explored subjects such as dualism and Trinity through the manipulation of religious references and symbols.

Last preferred the work to speak for itself and, unless asked, opted not to go into detail. 
He carved wood such as Jarrah, using, for example, the cruciform shape in relativistic relationships which left interpretation open. One such form could refer to animals, plants, icons, people or groups.

A fine example of his large-scale bronzes entitled "Family" was commissioned by the Government of Australia, in 1971, as an official gift to the international organization, Asian Development Bank, which displays it in its headquarters in Manila.

References

Further reading 
Max Dimmack, Clifford Last, Melbourne, Hawthorn Press. 1972. Monograph on Australian sculptor. 
Geoffrey Edwards, Noel Hutchison, Brett Lockwood (editor), Clifford Last Sculpture, A Retrospective Exhibition – 23 November 1989 – 29 January 1990, Catalogue, National Gallery of Victoria, Melbourne, 1989.

1918 births
1991 deaths
English sculptors
English male sculptors
Modern sculptors
People from Barrow-in-Furness
British emigrants to Australia
20th-century British sculptors